Jacob Ross FRSL (born 1956) is a Grenada-born poet, playwright, journalist, novelist and creative writing tutor, based in the UK since 1984.

Life and career
Jacob Ross was born in Hope Vale on the Caribbean island of Grenada, where he attended the Grenada Boys' Secondary School, later studying at the University of Grenoble, France. Since 1984 he has resided in Britain. He was formerly an editor of Artrage, an intercultural arts magazine, and is now associate fiction editor at Peepal Tree Press and associate editor of SABLE Literary Magazine. He has judged the Scott Moncrieff Prize (for French translation), the V.S. Pritchett Memorial Prize (2008) and the Tom-Gallon Trust Award (2009).

Ross has toured and lectured widely, including in Germany, Korea, the Middle East, and The Caribbean. In 2000, he was specially commissioned by the Peabody Trust to run the Millennium Writers Master class and in November that year became writer in residence for the London Borough of Streatham's Community Zone Literature Development Initiative. He was Writer-in-Residence at St. George's University in Grenada and the Darat Al Funun Arts Academy in Jordan in 2001.

Writing
In 1986 his first collection of short stories, Song for Simone, was published and was described as "one of the most powerful crystallisation of Caribbean childhood since George Lamming's In the Castle of My Skin." Song of Simone has been translated into several languages. Of Ross's second collection, A Way to Catch the Dust and Other Stories (1999), Bernardine Evaristo wrote in Wasafiri: "These stories are refined, timeless and startlingly beautiful and if Walcott is the poet laureate of the Caribbean Sea then with this collection, Ross becomes a major contender as its chief prose stylist.... Ross, following in the tradition of Hemingway and Morrison, displays all the brilliance of a great storyteller in action."

His first novel, Pynter Bender, was published in 2008. It was shortlisted for 2009's Commonwealth Writers' Prize, the Society of Authors' "Best First Novel" and the Caribbean Review of Books "Book of the Year". Ross is also the editor of Closure: Contemporary Black British Short Stories, published by Peepal Tree Press.

His second novel, The Bone Readers, was published in 2016 was awarded the inaugural Jhalak Prize.

In November 2017, Ross published his collected stories, Tell No-One About This. David Constantine wrote:

Awards and recognition
 2006: Fellow of the Royal Society of Literature
 2017: Jhalak Prize for Book of the Year by a Writer of Colour for The Bone Readers.

Selected writings and editorial work 
Song for Simone and Other Stories (London: Karia Press, 1986)
Behind the Masquerade: The Story of Notting Hill Carnival (with Kwesi Owusu) (Arts Media Group, 1988)
Voice, Memory, Ashes: Lest We Forget (co-edited with Dr Joan Anim-Addo) (London: Mango Publishing, 1998)
A Way to Catch the Dust and Other Stories (London: Mango Publishing, 1999)
Ridin' n Risin: Short stories by new black writers (Black Inc) and Turf (co-edited with Andrea Enisuoh)
Pynter Bender (Harper Perennial, 2008)
The Bone Readers (Peepal Tree Press, 2016)
Black Rain Falling (London: Hachette, 2020)

References

External links
Jacob Ross - Writer - Author's website
Jacob Ross at openDemocracy
Profile at Grassroutes, University of Leicester
"The Literature of Identity" (interview with Jacob Ross), The Star (Amman, Jordan), 3 October 2000.
 The Jacob Ross Website.
 Jacob Ross at wordfactory.tv
 Jacob Ross at Peepal Tree Press

Living people
1956 births
20th-century British dramatists and playwrights
20th-century British male writers
20th-century British poets
20th-century British short story writers
21st-century British dramatists and playwrights
21st-century British male writers
21st-century British novelists
21st-century British poets
Black British writers
British male dramatists and playwrights
British male novelists
British male poets
British male short story writers
Fellows of the Royal Society of Literature
Grenadian dramatists and playwrights
Grenadian male writers
Grenadian novelists
Grenadian poets
Grenadian short story writers